Reg or Reginald Parker may refer to:

 Reg Parker (footballer) (1921–1997), Welsh footballer
 Reg Parker (rugby league) (1927–2014), English rugby league footballer
 Reginald Parker (footballer) (born 1902), English footballer
 Reginald Parker (sport shooter) (born 1916), Australian sport shooter
 Reginald John Marsden Parker (1881–1948), Lieutenant Governor of Saskatchewan

See also
Reg Park (1928–2007), English bodybuilder and actor